Shane Olivea (October 7, 1981 – March 2, 2022) was an American professional football player who was an offensive tackle in the National Football League (NFL). He was drafted by the San Diego Chargers in the seventh round of the 2004 NFL Draft. He played college football at Ohio State. Olivea was also a member of the New York Giants, as well as the Florida Tuskers and Virginia Destroyers of the United Football League.

College career
Olivea grew up in Long Beach, New York, and attended Lawrence High School his senior year. Olivea attended Ohio State University and played college football for the Ohio State Buckeyes from 2000 to 2003. He was a three-year starter and a two-time member of the All-Big Ten second team.

Professional career

2004 NFL Draft
Originally valued as a third rounder, Olivea strained his pectoral muscle lifting weights about a week before the draft and this scared away a lot of teams. One of which was the Miami Dolphins, who wanted to take Olivea in the first day, but called just before their 3rd round pick to tell Olivea that they took him off their draft board because they thought he would need surgery. A. J. Smith, excited at the fact Olivea was off many draft boards, took him with one of their final picks. Concerning Olivea's injury status, AJ said, “We checked him out, like a lot of clubs, but medical staffs vary. We rely heavily on our medical staff, and he checked out perfectly. We’re not going to take a chance if we think a player is damaged goods. We were doing other things (in earlier rounds), so selfishly we were kind of glad he took a ride (dropped in draft status) and he was still there. We kind of stole one in the seventh round.”

Olivea was drafted by the Chargers (209th overall) in the last round of the 2004 NFL Draft.

San Diego Chargers
Since being drafted in 2004, Olivea started 31 of 32 games in 2 seasons for the Chargers. In August 2006, The Chargers rewarded Olivea with a 6-year, $20 million extension. The deal made him the sixth highest-paid right tackle in the NFL at the time. Due to his performance and his low draft position, Olivea was considered to be a draft steal.

On February 28, 2008, Olivea was released by the Chargers, due to a missed drug test following a previous failed drug test. Olivea tested positive for pain medication.

New York Giants
On July 10, 2008, it was reported that Olivea had agreed to terms on a contract with the New York Giants.

On August 14, 2008, the Giants placed Olivea on season-ending injured reserve with a back injury. He was later released with an injury settlement.

Personal life
During his playing career, Olivea developed an addiction to pain killers. He said that he took as many as 125 Vicodin pills in one day. He checked into the Betty Ford Center in 2008 and spent 89 days in treatment there. In 2015, Olivea returned to Ohio State to complete his bachelor's degree.

Death
Olivea died on March 2, 2022, at the age of 40, with the cause of death revealed on June 21 to be from hypertensive heart disease contributed by obesity.

References

External links
Just Sports Stats

1981 births
2022 deaths
Sportspeople from the Bronx
Players of American football from New York City
People from Cedarhurst, New York
People from Long Beach, New York
American football offensive tackles
Ohio State Buckeyes football players
San Diego Chargers players
New York Giants players
Florida Tuskers players
Virginia Destroyers players
Sportspeople from Nassau County, New York
People from Lawrence, Nassau County, New York
Lawrence High School (Cedarhurst, New York) alumni